HMS Rhododendron was a  that served with the Royal Navy during the Second World War. She served as an ocean escort in the Battle of the Atlantic.

Background
The ship was ordered on 19 September 1939 from Harland and Wolff in Belfast, Northern Ireland. The ship's keel was laid on 22 May 1940, and the ship was launched on 2 September. The ship was commissioned about one month later, on 18 October.

War Service
On 21 November 1940, Rhododendron, part of the escort for Convoy OB244, attacked the German U-boat U-103 with depth charges, helping to drive the submarine away from the convoy. Although U-103 escaped unscathed, this attack led to the incorrect claim that Rhododendron had sunk U-104. That same day, she picked up 36 survivors from the merchant ship Daydawn, which earlier that day had been sunk by U-103. At the beginning of 1941, Rhododendron was part of the 8th Escort Group. On 17 January 1941, she detonated a mine in Liverpool harbor, knocking out her engines and steering gear and causing minor structural damage. Rhododendron was under repair at Liverpool for three months. On 28 July 1941, she picked up 26 survivors from the Lapland, a merchant ship which was torpedoed by U-203. On 1 October 1941, Rhododendron was part of the 36th Escort Group, based at Liverpool.

In November 1942, the British and Americans landed in French North Africa in Operation Torch, with Rhododendron helping to escort one of the convoys carrying invasion forces from Britain to the Centre Task Force beaches at Arzew near Oran in Algeria on 9 November. On 4 July 1943, she picked up more than 300 survivors from several merchant ships which were torpedoed by German submarines U-409 and U-375 off of Algeria.

Fate

She was sold in 1950 to a shipping company, where she was turned into the merchant Maj Finke. She was sold for demolition in South Africa in 1968.

References

Sources

 

 

Flower-class corvettes of the Royal Navy
1940 ships